The 1890 Richmond Colts football team was an American football team that represented Richmond College—now known as the University of Richmond—as an independent during the 1890 college football season. The team went winless and was coached by University of Richmond alumnus C. T. Taylor.

Schedule

References

Richmond
Richmond Spiders football seasons
College football winless seasons
Richmond Colts football